is a passenger railway station located in Kawasaki-ku, Kawasaki, Kanagawa Prefecture, Japan, operated by East Japan Railway Company (JR East). It is also a freight depot for the Japan Freight Railway Company (JR Freight).

Lines
Ōkawa Station is the terminus of the Ōkawa branch of the Tsurumi Line, and is 5.1 km from the western terminus of the line at Tsurumi Station.

Station layout

The station consists of a single side platform serving a single track for both inbound and outbound trains. The station is unattended.

Platforms

History
Ōkawa Station opened on 10 March 1926, as a freight-handling station on the privately held . Passenger services started on October 28, 1930. The line was nationalized on July 1, 1943, and was later absorbed into the Japanese National Railways (JNR) network. The station has been unattended since March 1, 1971. With the privatization of JNR on April 1, 1987, the station came under the control of JR East.

Surrounding area
 Nisshin Seifun Tsurumi Factory
 Showa Denko Kawasaki Office
 Mitsubishi Kakoki Headquarters, Kawasaki Seisakusho
Okawa Industrial Park

See also
 List of railway stations in Japan

References

External links

 JR East Ōkawa Station 

Railway stations in Japan opened in 1930
Railway stations in Kawasaki, Kanagawa
Stations of Japan Freight Railway Company
Stations of East Japan Railway Company